Anthony Lowther, FRS (c. 1641 – 27 January 1693) was an English landowner, of Marske-by-the-Sea, Yorkshire and Member of Parliament.

He was the eldest son of draper Robert Lowther (died 1655), an alderman of London and his second wife Elizabeth. Robert's brother was Sir John Lowther of Lowther. In 1649, he and his nephew, Sir John Lowther, 1st Baronet, of Lowther, MP for Westmorland, bought Marske-by-the-Sea for £13,000 and developed the alum deposits there.

He was one of the original Fellows of the Royal Society, from its chartered inception in 1663.

He was elected Member of Parliament for Appleby in March and October, 1679.

He died in 1693 and was buried at Walthamstow. In February 1667, he had married Margaret Penn, daughter of Sir William Penn, and had one son, Sir William Lowther, 1st Baronet (1670–1705), who was created a baronet in 1697 and became MP for Lancaster in 1702.

References

Lowther pedigree 1

Original Fellows of the Royal Society
1640s births
1693 deaths
English landowners
Anthony
English MPs 1679
English MPs 1680–1681